The Rowtor Target Railway was a military narrow gauge target railway south of Okehampton in Dartmoor, England with a gauge of .

History 
The Rowtor Target Railway was built 1959 as a target railway based on an older target railway. There are four points, which are still in a working order, because the track and the trolley are maintained by a group of railway enthusiasts.

By the dumbbell shaped design with turning loops at either end, it was possible to run the unmanned trolley, onto which a wooden target in the shape of a military tank was fixed, continuously back and forth along track.

References 

Military railways in the United Kingdom
2 ft gauge railways in England